Bryotropha affinis is a moth of the family Gelechiidae. It is found in most of Europe.

The wingspan is 9–12 mm. Adults are on wing from June to July. The forewings are dark greyish brown to black. The hindwings are grey, but darker towards the apex. Adults have been recorded on wing from May to September.

The larvae feed on various mosses. They feed from within a silken gallery. They have a dull purplish brown body.

References

Moths described in 1828
affinis
Moths of Europe